CKGL (570 AM) is a Canadian radio station, which broadcasts at 570 AM in Kitchener, Ontario. The station currently broadcasts a news/talk format branded on-air as CityNews 570. The station is owned by Rogers Sports & Media, and is an affiliate of the Toronto Blue Jays Radio Network. CKGL is also the radio broadcaster for the Kitchener Rangers.

History

The station was originally launched in 1949 as FM 96.7 CKCR-FM, simulcasting the programming of CKCR.

In 1965, the stations were acquired by Great Lakes Broadcasting, a consortium that included Maclean-Hunter. Both stations changed their callsigns to CHYM (pronounced as "chime") that year. Among the first disc jockeys on CHYM were Gene Scott, Vic Thomas, Sandy Hoyt, Keith Sterling, and Larry Shannon.

Distinct programming was launched on CHYM for the first time in 1968. In 1972, the FM outlet's callsign was changed again, to the current CKGL (evidently for "Kitchener, Great Lakes").

In 1982, Maclean-Hunter took over full ownership of the stations.
The CHYM and CKGL intellectual units (call signs, branding, and programming, but not the licences themselves) swapped frequencies on September 4, 1992 at 8:00 a.m, with CKGL moving to the AM band. (CRTC approval was required, but only as a format swap between the existing stations at 570 and 96.7, not a formal exchange of frequencies.) The stations became part of Rogers Communications in 1994 when that company acquired Maclean-Hunter.

When CHYM and CKGL swapped frequencies, the CKGL country format was moved to AM with CKGL. On June 19, 1997, this successful format was changed to news/talk.

In late 2005, CKGL adopted the popular all-news format for the morning and afternoon drive time slots.
In 2007, CKGL won the RTNDA Edward R. Murrow Award for "Best Newscast". The winning newscast aired Friday October 6, 2006 at 7 AM and highlighted RIM co-CEO Jim Balsillie's intent to buy the Pittsburgh Penguins. CKGL had a reporter live in Pittsburgh when Balsillie made the announcement.

In June 2021, Rogers announced that it would rebrand CKGL and its other all-news and news/talk radio stations under the CityNews brand beginning October 18, 2021. As with similarly-branded Ottawa sister station CIWW, the broadcast signal of Citytv's Toronto flagship station reaches Waterloo Region and is also available on cable, satellite, and fibre TV services, but Citytv Toronto does not cover local news in the market.

References

External links 
 CityNews 570
 
 

KGL
KGL
KGL
Radio stations established in 1949
1949 establishments in Ontario